Zataria is a genus of flowering plant in the family Lamiaceae, first described in 1876. It contains only one known species, Zataria multiflora, native to southwestern Asia (Iran, Afghanistan, Pakistan, Kashmir).

References

Lamiaceae
Flora of Asia
Monotypic Lamiaceae genera
Taxa named by Pierre Edmond Boissier